Stefanie Löhr is a German football goalkeeper, currently playing for SG Essen-Schönebeck in the Bundesliga. She previously played for FCR Duisburg and SC Bad Neuenahr.

References

1979 births
Living people
German women's footballers
1. FC Saarbrücken (women) players
FCR 2001 Duisburg players
SC 07 Bad Neuenahr players
SGS Essen players
Women's association football goalkeepers